Arthur Joseph "Marty" Shay (April 25, 1896 – February 20, 1951) was a professional baseball player. He played parts of two seasons in Major League Baseball for the Chicago Cubs (1916) and Boston Braves (1924), primarily as a second baseman. Listed at 5 ft 7 in, 148 lb, Shay batted and threw right-handed.

Born in Boston, Massachusetts, Shay was a .240 hitter (18-for-75) with three doubles and one triple in 21 games, stealing two bases and scoring four runs while driving in two more.

Shay played in the minor leagues from 1917 until 1927 in addition to his two brief stints in the majors with the Cubs and Braves. In 1130 minor league games, he batted .286 with one home run and collected 1259 hits, but only 174 were for extra bases.

Shay died in Worcester, Massachusetts, at the age of 54.

Sources

Major League Baseball infielders
Boston Braves players
Chicago Cubs players
St. Joseph Drummers players
Hutchinson Wheatshockers players
Toledo Mud Hens players
New Haven Weissmen players
New Haven Indians players
Worcester Panthers players
Hartford Senators players
Bridgeport Bears (baseball) players
Baseball players from Massachusetts
1896 births
1951 deaths